The Battle of Kalnabu was a military engagement fought in May 1837 between the forces of Kenfu Haile Giorgis, an Ethiopian nobleman of Qwara, and an Ottoman force reinforced by Sudanese irregulars in modern day Al Qadrif. Due to the similarities between Kalnabu, the First Battle of Gallabat, and the Battle of Wadkaltabu which would occur a month later, the two events are often conflated and details mixed up.

Background
The district the battle occurred in is distinct from others in Al Qadarif, having been an 18th century colony of Takruri from Darfur who obtained permission from the Emperor of Ethiopia to make a permanent settlement there. One notable ruler of the Tukrir was Sheikh Miri, who has been described as "probably the most celebrated of these border chiefs." The Sheikh formed an alliance with the Khedive some time after Muhammad Ali of Egypt had conquered the Sennar sultanate in 1821, and proclaimed himself independent of the Ethiopian Empire. He accompanied the Turks (Egyptians) in their raid on Gondar, but according to some sources, escaped the ambush of Dejazmatch Kinfu; having been killed a year later by future emperor Kassa Hailu's attack on Gallabat. According to other sources, he was slain at Kalnabu.

The conflict itself began when an Egyptian governor was sent to Gallabat to collect tribute from the area, "which submitted in 1832 and again in 1834, but which was still claimed by the Ethiopians." After advancing beyond Metemma, the Egyptians decided to retreat after hearing of a large Ethiopian force sent to collect tribute from Gallabat.

Battle
Not much detail is given on the battle itself; The sheikh of the Tekruris accompanied a larger Egyptian force entered Metemma in the May of 1837. This force, likely reinforced by part of the population of Metemma, started to advance in the direction of Gondar, pillaging and burning through the area it crossed. Believing that the intention of the Egyptians was to sack the town, Gondar was thrown into panic, while the governor of Dembiya, Dejazmatch Kinfu, quickly gathered an army and moved north to attack the invaders who had already returned to the area around Gallabat. The Egyptian force retreated in the direction of their military post at Doka further in modern-day Sudan, but were forced to battle at a place named "Kalnabu" near the town of Rashid, in an open area very unsuitable for defending against the Ethiopian cavalry (which Qwarans were known for). Most of the regular infantry, the officers of both forces, and Sheikh Miri were captured or killed, although part of the irregular cavalry escaped.

Aftermath
The Egyptians continued their activity on the Ethiopian border but an actual Egyptian invasion of Ethiopia would not occur until decades later.

References 

1837 in Africa
Kalnabu
Kalnabu